Sven William "Wille" Löfqvist (12 April 1947 – 23 October 2016) was a Swedish ice hockey goaltender who played for the Swedish national team. He won a bronze medal at the 1980 Winter Olympics. He later became a professional golfer and played on the Swedish Golf Tour.

Löfqvist died on 23 October 2016 at the age of 69, suffering from breast cancer, and attempted to raise awareness that men can also be affected.

References

External links

1947 births
2016 deaths
Swedish ice hockey goaltenders
Brynäs IF players
Ice hockey players at the 1980 Winter Olympics
Olympic ice hockey players of Sweden
Medalists at the 1980 Winter Olympics
Olympic medalists in ice hockey
Olympic bronze medalists for Sweden
Swedish male golfers
People from Gävle
Deaths from male breast cancer
Deaths from cancer in Sweden
Sportspeople from Gävleborg County